The Condesa pocket park, (Spanish: Parque de bolsillo de la Condesa), is a pocket park in the Condesa neighborhood of the Cuauhtémoc borough in Mexico City. 

The park opened in June 2013 and was created on land that was formerly part of the intersection of Avenida Michoacán and Avenida Vicente Suárez streets. 

Its design features include: 8 Magnolia trees, 3 bicycle racks, 10 park benches, and 16 raised planters. 

The cost was about $650,000 Mexican pesos, or $50,000 USD in 2013.

References

Condesa
Parks in Mexico City
Pocket parks
Urban renewal